Doug DeWitt (born August 13, 1961) is an American former professional boxer who competed from 1980 to 1992, holding the inaugural WBO middleweight title from 1989 to 1990.

Career
Known as "Cobra," DeWitt was raised in Yonkers, New York, and started boxing at the age of 15. He compiled an amateur record of 35–4. By the time he was 18, he had turned pro. He won three middleweight titles during a 12-year career.

Professional boxing record

|-
|align="center" colspan=8|33 Wins (19 knockouts, 14 decisions), 8 Losses (4 knockouts, 4 decisions), 5 Draws 
|-
| align="center" style="border-style: none none solid solid; background: #e3e3e3"|Result
| align="center" style="border-style: none none solid solid; background: #e3e3e3"|Record
| align="center" style="border-style: none none solid solid; background: #e3e3e3"|Opponent
| align="center" style="border-style: none none solid solid; background: #e3e3e3"|Type
| align="center" style="border-style: none none solid solid; background: #e3e3e3"|Round
| align="center" style="border-style: none none solid solid; background: #e3e3e3"|Date
| align="center" style="border-style: none none solid solid; background: #e3e3e3"|Location
| align="center" style="border-style: none none solid solid; background: #e3e3e3"|Notes
|-align=center
|Loss
|
|align=left| James Toney
|RTD
|6
|05/12/1992
|align=left| Trump Taj Mahal, Atlantic City, New Jersey, U.S.
|align=left|
|-
|Win
|
|align=left| Dan Sherry
|SD
|10
|28/05/1992
|align=left| Kushers Country Club, Monticello, New York, U.S.
|align=left|
|-
|Draw
|
|align=left| Tyrone Frazier
|MD
|10
|07/02/1992
|align=left| Atlantic City Convention Center, Atlantic City, New Jersey, U.S.
|align=left|
|-
|Loss
|
|align=left| Nigel Benn
|TKO
|8
|29/04/1990
|align=left| Caesars Atlantic City, Atlantic City, New Jersey, U.S.
|align=left|
|-
|Win
|
|align=left| Matthew Hilton
|TKO
|11
|15/01/1990
|align=left| Atlantic City Convention Center, Atlantic City, New Jersey, U.S.
|align=left|
|-
|Win
|
|align=left| Robbie Sims
|SD
|12
|18/04/1989
|align=left| Showboat Atlantic City, Atlantic City, New Jersey, U.S.
|align=left|
|-
|Loss
|
|align=left| Sumbu Kalambay
|TKO
|7
|08/11/1988
|align=left| Stade Louis II, Monte Carlo, Monaco
|align=left|
|-
|Win
|
|align=left| Alberto Gonzalez
|KO
|6
|19/08/1988
|align=left| Resorts Casino Hotel, Atlantic City, New Jersey, U.S.
|align=left|
|-
|Draw
|
|align=left| Ron Essett
|PTS
|10
|29/01/1988
|align=left| Resorts Casino Hotel, Atlantic City, New Jersey, U.S.
|align=left|
|-
|Win
|
|align=left| Tony Thornton
|MD
|13
|06/11/1987
|align=left| Sands Atlantic City, Atlantic City, New Jersey, U.S.
|align=left|
|-
|Win
|
|align=left| Lenny LaPaglia
|UD
|10
|18/08/1987
|align=left| Resorts Casino Hotel, Atlantic City, New Jersey, U.S.
|align=left|
|-
|Loss
|
|align=left| José Quiñones
|TKO
|3
|20/02/1987
|align=left| Sands Atlantic City, Atlantic City, New Jersey, U.S.
|align=left|
|-
|Loss
|
|align=left| Tommy Hearns
|UD
|12
|17/10/1986
|align=left| Cobo Hall, Detroit, Michigan, U.S.
|align=left|
|-
|Loss
|
|align=left| Milton McCrory
|UD
|10
|13/07/1986
|align=left| Showboat Hotel and Casino, Las Vegas, Nevada, U.S.
|align=left|
|-
|Win
|
|align=left| Charles Boston
|UD
|10
|06/05/1986
|align=left| Atlantic City, New Jersey, U.S.
|align=left|
|-
|Win
|
|align=left| Luis Rivera
|TKO
|7
|18/01/1986
|align=left| Sands Atlantic City, Atlantic City, New Jersey, U.S.
|align=left|
|-
|Loss
|
|align=left| Robbie Sims
|UD
|10
|30/08/1985
|align=left| Trump Plaza Hotel and Casino, Atlantic City, New Jersey, U.S.
|align=left|
|-
|Draw
|
|align=left| Don Lee
|PTS
|10
|08/03/1985
|align=left| Westchester County Center, White Plains, New York, U.S.
|align=left|
|-
|Win
|
|align=left| Jimmie Sykes
|TKO
|1
|04/10/1984
|align=left| Resorts Casino Hotel, Atlantic City, New Jersey, U.S.
|align=left|
|-
|Win
|
|align=left| Bobby Hoye
|UD
|10
|19/04/1984
|align=left| Resorts Casino Hotel, Atlantic City, New Jersey, U.S.
|align=left|
|-
|Win
|
|align=left| Mike Tinley
|UD
|12
|17/02/1984
|align=left| Atlantic City, New Jersey, U.S.
|align=left|
|-
|Win
|
|align=left| Freddie Boynton
|RTD
|5
|13/01/1984
|align=left| Westchester County Center, White Plains, New York, U.S.
|align=left|
|-
|Win
|
|align=left| Hector Rosario
|KO
|4
|09/09/1983
|align=left| Madison Square Garden, New York City, New York, U.S.
|align=left|
|-
|Win
|
|align=left| King Starling
|TKO
|8
|10/08/1983
|align=left| Westchester County Center, White Plains, New York, U.S.
|align=left|
|-
|Win
|
|align=left| Vernon Reed
|KO
|1
|16/02/1983
|align=left| Meadowlands Arena, East Rutherford, New Jersey, U.S.
|align=left|
|-
|Win
|
|align=left| Larry Rayford
|KO
|6
|03/12/1982
|align=left| Louisiana Superdome, New Orleans, Louisiana, U.S.
|align=left|
|-
|Win
|
|align=left| Teddy Mann
|TKO
|5
|20/10/1982
|align=left| Westchester County Center, White Plains, New York, U.S.
|align=left|
|-
|Win
|
|align=left| William Page
|KO
|1
|02/10/1982
|align=left| Sands Atlantic City, Atlantic City, New Jersey, U.S.
|align=left|
|-
|Win
|
|align=left| Mike Hyman
|TKO
|6
|04/08/1982
|align=left| Westchester County Center, White Plains, New York, U.S.
|align=left|
|-
|Draw
|
|align=left| Ben Serrano
|PTS
|8
|21/03/1982
|align=left| Playboy Hotel and Casino, Atlantic City, New Jersey, U.S.
|align=left|
|-
|Win
|
|align=left| Bill Medei
|TKO
|1
|04/03/1982
|align=left| Sands Atlantic City, Atlantic City, New Jersey, U.S.
|align=left|
|-
|Win
|
|align=left| Danny Long
|PTS
|8
|04/02/1982
|align=left| Sands Atlantic City, Atlantic City, New Jersey, U.S.
|align=left|
|-
|Win
|
|align=left| Charlie Hecker
|TKO
|5
|22/12/1981
|align=left| Atlantic City, New Jersey, U.S.
|align=left|
|-
|Draw
|
|align=left| Tony Suero
|PTS
|8
|24/11/1981
|align=left| Westchester County Center, White Plains, New York, U.S.
|align=left|
|-
|Win
|
|align=left| Danny McAloon
|TKO
|3
|09/10/1981
|align=left| Westchester County Center, White Plains, New York, U.S.
|align=left|
|-
|Win
|
|align=left| Lenny Villers
|TKO
|8
|25/06/1981
|align=left| Tarrytown, New York, U.S.
|align=left|
|-
|Win
|
|align=left| Kevin Cheatum
|KO
|1
|24/04/1981
|align=left| Westchester County Center, White Plains, New York, U.S.
|align=left|
|-
|Loss
|
|align=left| Ben Serrano
|PTS
|8
|08/03/1981
|align=left| Resorts Casino Hotel, Atlantic City, New Jersey, U.S.
|align=left|
|-
|Win
|
|align=left| Willard Nance
|PTS
|8
|18/02/1981
|align=left| Westchester County Center, White Plains, New York, U.S.
|align=left|
|-
|Win
|
|align=left| Larry Davis
|PTS
|6
|21/01/1981
|align=left| Westchester County Center, White Plains, New York, U.S.
|align=left|
|-
|Win
|
|align=left| Derrick Doughty
|KO
|1
|17/12/1980
|align=left| Westchester County Center, White Plains, New York, U.S.
|align=left|
|-
|Win
|
|align=left| Terry Duncan
|UD
|6
|15/10/1980
|align=left| Westchester County Center, White Plains, New York, U.S.
|align=left|
|-
|Win
|
|align=left| Larry Davis
|PTS
|6
|17/09/1980
|align=left| Westchester County Center, White Plains, New York, U.S.
|align=left|
|-
|Win
|
|align=left| Calvin Cook
|PTS
|4
|11/06/1980
|align=left| Westchester County Center, White Plains, New York, U.S.
|align=left|
|-
|Win
|
|align=left| Charlie Hecker
|KO
|3
|14/05/1980
|align=left| Westchester County Center, White Plains, New York, U.S.
|align=left|
|-
|Win
|
|align=left| Peter Pennello
|PTS
|4
|28/03/1980
|align=left| Dick Clark Theatre, Tarrytown, New York, U.S.
|align=left|
|}

References

External links

Professional titles 

1961 births
Living people
Boxers from Youngstown, Ohio
Middleweight boxers
People from Yonkers, New York
Boxers from New York (state)
American male boxers